Cherlanqush (also Romanized as Cherlānqūsh; also known as Cherlān Qūch) is a village in Qanibeyglu Rural District, Zanjanrud District, Zanjan County, Zanjan Province, Iran. At the 2006 census, its population was 200, in 44 families.

References 

Populated places in Zanjan County